The Crosslands was a public house in the Maryhill area of Glasgow, Scotland, that featured in the 1996 film Trainspotting. It is now known as BrewHaus.

Location 
The pub is located on the north end of Queen Margaret Drive, Glasgow.

History 
The building was originally constructed as a Baptist Chapel.

In 2015, the historically working-class pub was given a £40,000 refurbishment by new owners Kained Holdings in an attempt to attract more middle-class customers. In 2016, it was known as The Kelbourne Saint and by 2022 it was called BrewHaus.

Feature in Trainspotting 

The Crosslands appears in a scene in Danny Boyle's 1996 Trainspotting, in the scene character Francis "Franco" Begbie throws a pint glass from the pubs mezzanine area to the area below, injuring a female patron and starting a fight.

The film's producers paid the pub's owners £700 and its customers £20 each plus free drinks to get their approval to shoot the scene.

See also 

 The Volcano (nightclub)

References 

Pubs in Glasgow